Fly Creek may refer to:

Streams
Fly Creek (Clear Creek tributary), a stream in Missouri 
Fly Creek (Sacandaga River tributary), a stream in Hamilton County, New York
Fly Creek (Schoharie Creek tributary), a stream in Montgomery and Schoharie counties, New York
Fly Creek (Oaks Creek tributary), a stream in Otsego County, New York
Fly Creek (Oquaga Creek tributary), a stream in Broome County, New York

Settlements
Fly Creek, New York, a hamlet in New York
Fly Creek, Northern Territory, a community in Australia